Mangrulpir  is a city with Municipal council in Washim district in the Indian state of Maharashtra. Mangrulpir is place of honorary Pir Dada Hayat Qalandar who is one of 3 Qualandars all over the world. That's the reason how the city got its name.

Every year in the city there is famous Sandal (Urs). Mangrulpir is also famous for Shree Birbalnath Mahararaj. Every Year City holds Shree BirbalNath Maharaj Jatra.

Municipality
The Municipality at Mangrulpir is the youngest in the district. The Municipality was established at Mangrulpir in 1959 and is governed under the Maharashtra Municipalities Act, 1965. It covered an area of 11.76 square km. The Municipal council is composed 10 members with no seat reserved either for the scheduled castes or the scheduled tribes, or for women.

Places to Visit 

• There are historic places of interest such as Dargah of Hazrat Sayyad Ahmad Kabeer and other Muslim saints and peers. The town is called Mangrulpir on account of these associations. 

• There is also a temple dedicated to Birbalnath Maharaj who hailed from Punjab and took samadhi on February 4, 1928. An annual fair is held in honour of Birbalnath Maharaj on Magha Shuddha 14-January–February.About 10 to 12 thousand people assemble at the time of the fair.

Population

Geography
Mangrulpir has coordinates 77.346789°E 20.310143°N. Mangrulpir town is located in Washim district. The whole region lies on the deccan plateau. It has an altitude of 429m. The town is 40 km from district headquarter and 671 km from state capital Mumbai. It is an important town in the district. Mangrulpir Tehsil has a strong rural network. Washim is nearest railway station.

Climate 
This town has a tropical savannah climate. The Köppen-Geiger climate classification is Aw. Although temperatures remain warm to hot throughout the year, the period between October to February experiences cold temperatures during nights. Mid-February to May is hot and dry. Humidity starts increasing with the advent of Indian South-West Monsoon from June. Early June to Early October sees heavy rainfall in spells.

See also
Tarhala 
Karanja Lad 
Washim

References

Cities and towns in Washim district
Talukas in Maharashtra